William Blackadder (2 April 1915 – 16 September 1990) was a Scotland international rugby union player. He played as a wing.

Rugby Union career

Amateur career
In 1933 he was playing for the Scottish Wayfarers.

Blackadder played for West of Scotland.

In April 1938 he played for the representative side Co-Optimists.

He then moved to play for Newcastle Northern.

Provincial career

Blackadder started for the Scotland Probables side for the second and final trial match of that season, on 15 January 1938. He switched to play for the Scotland Possibles in the second half.

He played for Scotland Possibles in January 1939, then playing for Newcastle Northern.

While he was playing for Newcastle Northern he represented Northumberland county.

International career

Blackadder was capped by Scotland just the once, in 1938.

References

1915 births
1990 deaths
Co-Optimist Rugby Club players
Rugby union players from Edinburgh
Scottish rugby union players
Scotland international rugby union players
Scotland Probables players
Scotland Possibles players
West of Scotland FC players
Rugby union wings